Cobbs Hill Reservoir is a reservoir located in Cobbs Hill Park in Rochester, New York, United States. The reservoir is used to supply drinking water to the city of Rochester.  The source of the water is Hemlock Lake, which lies 30 miles due south of and 400 feet higher elevation than Rochester.

Construction was completed in 1908. The smaller Lake Riley north of it was part of the old Erie Canal system. I-490 now runs on the old canal bed here.

The land comprising modern-day Cobbs Hill Park belonged to Gideon Cobb, an earlier settler of Rochester.
The land was acquired by the city through various land purchases, and donations. The largest donation was the remaining 15 acres crowning the hilltop of Cobbs Hill.

The granite gatehouse atop the hill was designed by architect J. Foster Warner in Greek Revival style. The structure featured a wide portico with an ornate drinking fountain.

With its surrounding iron fencing and Parisian lamp posts, the 12.8 acre reservoir further added to the landscape of Cobbs Hill. Animated by a fountain, the reservoir reportedly has the sitting capacity to fill every bath tub in Rochester, NY, twice daily, for two months.

An overlook was developed in consultation with the agency of Frederick Law Olmsted— the firm responsible for creating the Rochester Parks system in the late 1880s. Olmsted executives urged the city to maintain this bluff to provide citizens with unobtrusive skyline views.

A refectory, with cafeteria and observation deck, once stood on the site now occupied by a radio tower. Funded by The New Deal in 1933, the refectory hosted thousands of people a year through the mid-twentieth century. A beacon mounted to the observatory helped guide planes to the Greater Rochester International Airport.

Cobbs Hill Park remains a Rochester feature into the twenty-first century, and is used by joggers running the reservoir trail, sled riders gliding down the hill, sports enthusiasts playing on the athletic fields, or people partaking in the views or nature walks.

See also
American Water Landmark

References

External links 
D&C Retrofitting Rochester 
CityofRochester.gov - Cobb's Hill

Cobbs Hill Reservoir  at Find Lakes

Cobbs Hill Park Article, City of Rochester
 
RocWiki Info

Geography of Rochester, New York
Infrastructure completed in 1908
Reservoirs in Monroe County, New York
Protected areas of Monroe County, New York
Reservoirs in New York (state)
Tourist attractions in Rochester, New York
1908 establishments in New York (state)